On the Edge is the third album by the progressive bluegrass band Northern Lights.

Track listing

Personnel
 Taylor Armerding - mandolin, vocals
 Bob Emery - bass, vocals
 Bill Henry - vocals, guitar
 Mike Kropp - banjo, guitar

References

External links
Official site

1986 albums
Northern Lights (bluegrass band) albums